Richard Stirling is an English writer and actor, who has appeared on film, television and the West End theatre and Off-Broadway stage. He studied at the Royal Academy of Dramatic Art (RADA). He has written arts features for many newspapers and magazines, and drew attention for his 2009 play Seven Other Children, penned as a response to Caryl Churchill's controversial play Seven Jewish Children.

He drew further notice for adapting the diaries of Sir Cecil Beaton and for playing the title role. Following performances at the Edinburgh Festival Fringe in 2022, to favourable reviews, Cecil Beaton's Diaries was selected to be part of the 2023 Brits Off Broadway season, playing at New York's 59E59 Theaters in May, before touring the UK.

Works

Books

 Julie Andrews: An Intimate Biography (Sunday Times Top Ten best seller, UK Piatkus/Little Brown 2007; US St Martin's Press 2008; reprinted UK Little Brown 2013)

Plays
 Seven Other Children
 Over My Shoulder: The Jessie Matthews Story (starring Anne Rogers)
 Gay's the Word (revised version of the Ivor Novello/Alan Melville musical)
 Is She One of Us? in development
 A Princess Undone (starring Stephanie Beacham as Princess Margaret)
 Cecil Beaton's Diaries

Selected roles

Film and television
 The Man Who Fell to Earth (Bird Man) 2022
 Bridgerton (2022)
 The Crown (2020)
 The Princess Switch: Switched Again (2020)
 Scoop (Tinsley's Fan) (2006)
 Great Expectations (1999)
 Our Mutual Friend (1998)
 Mrs Dalloway (1997)
 The Secret Agent (Stevie) (1992)
 Jeeves and Wooster (1990)
 War Requiem (Third Soldier; choreographer) (1989)
 Little Dorrit (John Chivery) (1987)

References

External links

English dramatists and playwrights
Year of birth missing (living people)
Living people
English male dramatists and playwrights
Alumni of RADA